Best 1991–2004 is a 2004 compilation album by Seal, released by Warner Bros. Records. Several different versions of this album were released: one as a single disc containing Seal's greatest hits; a second (titled The Ultimate Collection) with an additional disc of 13 acoustic versions of Seal's greatest hits; a third which included a DVD-Audio disc plus the two The Ultimate Collection discs; a fourth with surround sound mixes of both The Ultimate Collection discs and a collection of music videos as well as the DVD-Audio disc; a fifth, available only for France, containing the single disc of hits along with the track "Les Mots", a duet with French singer Mylène Farmer, as a bonus track.

Track listing

Notes
  signifies a co-producer
  signifies an additional producer
  signifies a vocal producer

Charts

Weekly charts

Year-end charts

Certifications

References

2004 greatest hits albums
Seal (musician) compilation albums
Warner Records compilation albums